This is a list of Dutch television related events from 2004.

Events
22 February - Re-union are selected to represent Netherlands at the 2004 Eurovision Song Contest with their song "Without You". They are selected to be the forty-fifth Dutch Eurovision entry during Nationaal Songfestival held at Pepsi Stage Theatre in Amsterdam.
1 May - Boris Titulaer wins the second series of Idols. His debut single "When You Think of Me" reaches number one in the Dutch Top 40 three weeks later.

Debuts

Television shows

1950s
NOS Journaal (1956–present)

1970s
Sesamstraat (1976–present)

1980s
Jeugdjournaal (1981–present)
Het Klokhuis (1988–present)

1990s
Goede tijden, slechte tijden (1990–present)
Big Brother (1999-2006)
De Club van Sinterklaas (1999-2009)

2000s
Idols (2002-2008, 2016–present)

Ending this year

Births

Deaths

See also
2004 in the Netherlands